Chiromachla seychellensis is a moth of the  family Erebidae. It is found in the Seychelles.

References

Nyctemerina
Moths described in 1908